Caconemobius howarthi is a species of cricket known by the common name Howarth's cave cricket. It is native to Hawaii.

References

Insects of Hawaii
Ground crickets
Taxonomy articles created by Polbot
Insects described in 1978